Ernest Edward Holmes   (18 November 1854  – 22 February 1931) was an eminent Anglican priest and author. of the 20th century.

Holmes was ordained in 1876. He began his career with a curacy in  Rugeley after which he was Chaplain to the Lord Bishop of Cape Town and then the Lord Bishop of Oxford. Following this he was Vicar of Sonning from July 1901 and then Chaplain to Queen Alexandra. He was Archdeacon of London from 1911 to 1930.

Notes

External links
 
 

1854 births
Commanders of the Royal Victorian Order
Archdeacons of London
1931 deaths